Sankayuni (Aymara sankayu the edible fruit of the thorny Jachakana shrub, -ni a suffix to indicate ownership, "the one with the sankayu fruit", also  spelled Sancayuni) is a mountain in the Cordillera Real in the Andes of Bolivia, about  high. It is situated in the La Paz Department, Murillo Province, La Paz Municipality. Sankayuni lies southeast of Janq'u K'ark'a, west of Ullumani and Chankuni and northeast of Kunturiri.

References 

Mountains of La Paz Department (Bolivia)